The 1980 World Rally Championship was the eighth season of the Fédération Internationale de l'Automobile (FIA) World Rally Championship (WRC). The season consisted of 12 rallies. While this number was the same as the previous year, one change was made to the schedule, replacing Quebec with the Rally Codasur, marking the first WRC event to be held in South America.

A new driver's champion was crowned, with Fiat backed German driver Walter Röhrl taking the championship convincingly while simultaneously earning for Fiat its third and final manufacturer's title. Finn Hannu Mikkola and Swede Björn Waldegård again battled to a one-point difference in the standings, though this time for second place overall, and this time with Mikkola coming out on top. Fiat's position in the standings was challenged by both Datsun and Ford, but neither could overcome the Italian company's initial lead, settling instead for second and third, respectively.  1980 also saw Mercedes-Benz's best and final effort to compete for a WRC title, placing fourth overall.

For purposes of the championship, neither the Swedish or Finnish rallies were applied to the WRC for Manufacturers.


Championships

Manufacturers

Drivers

Events

See also 
 1980 in sports

External links

 FIA World Rally Championship 1980 at ewrc-results.com

World Rally Championship
World Rally Championship seasons